Little Hells is Marissa Nadler's fourth full-length studio album, released in March 2009 on Kemado Records. The poster for the Little Hells European tour was designed by Berlin-based poster artist Stefan Guzy.

Track listing
 "Heart Paper Lover" - 4:08
 "Rosary" - 3:56
 "Mary Come Alive" - 4:44
 "Little Hells" - 2:26
 "Ghosts & Lovers" - 4:16
 "Brittle, Crushed & Torn" - 3:12
 "The Whole Is Wide" - 4:39
 "River of Dirt" - 4:24
 "Loner" - 4:49
 "Mistress" - 5:42

Credits

Album
 Marissa Nadler - vocals, acoustic and electric guitar, wurlitzer
 Myles Baer - acoustic and electric guitar, theremin, wurlitzer
 Dave Scher - lap steel guitar, organ, piano, synthesizer
 Simone Pace - drums, percussion

Production
 Chris Coady - production, mixing, programming
 Brendan Muldowny - engineer
 David Tolomei - engineer
 Howie Weinberg - mastering

References

External links
Marissa Nadler Official Site

2009 albums
Marissa Nadler albums
Albums produced by Chris Coady